The Christian Council of Britain (CCoB) is an organisation founded by Robert West. While the CCoB claims to be "an independent, non-political organisation autonomous of any political party in Britain," it is closely associated with the British National Party, and West has been described as the BNP's religious affairs spokesman.

Founder
The Times has stated that West is "an ordained elder" of the Apostolic Church; however, the church denies knowledge of him and has distanced itself from his views. In 2006 West, then a Conservative Party councillor on South Holland District Council in Lincolnshire, was suspended from the Party after Lincoln's Race Equality Council expressed concerns over his links with the BNP. BBC News subsequently reported that he had set up his own church, based in a house in Holbeach, to preach "traditional Bible beliefs". 
He later stood as a BNP candidate in the 2009 Norwich North by-election and in Lincoln during the General election of 2010, losing his deposit in both cases.

West also stood unsuccessfully during the 2009 European elections in the East Midlands region.

Beliefs
The CCB claims that the Bible justifies its support for the BNP's repatriation policy, i.e. "firm but voluntary incentives for immigrants and their descendants to return home."

Opposition
The Christian Council of Britain has been criticised by a number of mainline British Christian organisations, who claim that "Christian belief is incompatible with any political party or philosophy that is based on hatred or treats people as inferior because of their race, beliefs or for any other reason" and argue against the CCoB's theological views on the separation of races.

See also
Christian right
Racism in the United Kingdom

References

External links
Film footage of the inaugural conference of the Christian Council of Britain in 2011

Organisations associated with the British National Party
Front organizations
Christian organisations based in the United Kingdom